Anti-replay is a sub-protocol of IPsec that is part of Internet Engineering Task Force (IETF). The main goal of anti-replay is to avoid hackers injecting or making changes in packets that travel from a source to a destination. Anti-replay protocol uses a unidirectional security association in order to establish a secure connection between two nodes in the network. Once a secure connection is established, the anti-replay protocol uses packet sequence numbers to defeat replay attacks as follows: When the source sends a message, it adds a sequence number to its packet; the sequence number starts at 0 and is incremented by 1 for each subsequent packet. The destination maintains a 'sliding window' record of the sequence numbers of validated received packets; it rejects all packets which have a sequence number which is lower than the lowest in the sliding window (i.e. too old) or already appears in the sliding window (i.e. duplicates/replays). Accepted packets, once validated, update the sliding window (displacing the lowest sequence number out of the window if it was already full).

See also 
 Cryptanalysis
 Man in the middle attack
 Replay attack
 Session ID
 Transport Layer Security

References 

Internet layer protocols
Cryptographic protocols
Tunneling protocols
Network layer protocols